General elections were held in Malta between 1 and 3 March 1888.

Background
The elections were the first held under the new Knutsford Constitution. The number of elected seats was increased from eight to ten, whilst a further four members were elected to represent nobility and landowners, graduates, clerics and the Chamber of Commerce.

Results
A total of 9,696 people were registered to vote, of which just 3,487 cast votes, giving a turnout of 36%.

References

1888
Malta
1888 in Malta
March 1888 events